Doomsdayer's Holiday is Grails' fifth album, released in 2008 through Temporary Residence.

Track listing
All songs written by Grails.

Personnel
Grails
Emil Amos – Lap Steel Guitar, Melodica, Vocals, Drums
Alex Hall – Guitar, Sampler
Zak Riles – Acoustic Guitar, Electric Guitar, Baglama
William Slater – Bass, Piano, Synthesizer, Guzheng, Vocals
Erik Nugent – Flute
Kate O'Brien-Clarke - Violin
Randall Dunn – Analog Synthesizer

References

2008 albums
Temporary Residence Limited albums
Grails (band) albums